Justin Welborn is a character actor and singer known for his roles in the films The Signal, Dance of the Dead, and The Final Destination. He was a recurring character on the FX Network hit show Justified, with his last appearance in season 6 episode 10.

Filmography

Television

Video 
2008 - MGS: Acquiescence - Stunt
2009 - Plague of the Damned - Plaid Zombie, other stunts

References

External links 

Justin Welborn in Flixster

Year of birth missing (living people)
Living people
American male film actors
American male television actors
American baritones